Horodenka (occasionally Horodence,  Horodenke) is a city located in Kolomyia Raion, Ivano-Frankivsk Oblast, in Western Ukraine. It hosts the administration of Horodenka urban hromada, one of the hromadas of Ukraine. Population: . In 2001 the population was around 9,800.

History

The first mention of Horodenka was in 1195, when it was described as a village in the Kingdom of Galicia–Volhynia inhabited by farmers and craftsmen. It was later part of the Polish–Lithuanian Commonwealth until 1772.

The 17th century saw a significant influx of Armenian immigrants to Horodenka. In 1706, a large Armenian Catholic church was erected in the town. In 1668 it became one of the Polish towns to be chartered under Magdeburg rights, through the use of a privilege known as "settlement with German law”.
From the first partition of Poland in 1772 until 1918, the town was part of the Austrian monarchy (Austria side after the compromise of 1867), head of the district with the same name, one of the 78 Bezirkshauptmannschaften in Austrian Galicia province (Crown land) in 1900. The fate of this province was then disputed between Poland and Ukraine, until the Peace of Riga in 1921.

In the period of the Second Polish Republic, it was a district capital within the Stanisławów Voivodeship.

During World War II the Jewish population of Horodenka, comprising about half of the town's population, were shot and killed in a mass grave by the Nazis. About a dozen Jews survived and formed a partisan combat unit which fought against the Nazis and hid in the forests. There is a synagogue in Salford, England named in honour of this community.

Until 18 July 2020, Horodenka was the administrative center of Horodenka Raion. The raion was abolished in July 2020 as part of the administrative reform of Ukraine, which reduced the number of raions of Ivano-Frankivsk Oblast to six. The area of Horodenka Raion was merged into Kolomyia Raion.

Famous people from Horodenka
Ben Bonus, Yiddish theater actor and singer
Nicholas Charnetsky (1884-1959), Ukrainian Catholic bishop and martyr.
Kasper Cieglewicz, Polish poet and independence activist.
Yuliya Dumanska, handball goalkeeper who plays for the Romanian national team since 2016.
Jakob Edelstein, Elder of the Jews in Theresienstadt.
Alfred Fiderkiewicz, political activist, mayor of Krakow, deputy to the Sejm in the interwar period.
Salo Flohr, chess grandmaster.
Alexander Granach (Jessaja Szajko Gronish), leading stage and film actor in Weimar Germany, died at 52 while establishing himself in Hollywood and on Broadway. Author of autobiography, There Goes an Actor [new edition: From the Shtetl to the Stage: the Odyssey of a Wandering Actor].
Seweryn Hammer, Polish scholar, professor of several universities.
Elias Jubal (born as Benno Neumann 12.1.1901), theatre director and founder of the Kellertheater "Theater für 49" in Vienna.
Dr. Wladimir Sylvester Kindraczuk (1882-1969), discoverer of Bacillus carpathicus in huslanka.
Marie Ljalková, sniper in the Soviet army.
Rabbi Nachman of Horodenka, a disciple of the Baal Shem Tov. 
Rena Pfiffer-Lax, opera singer 
 Mieczyslaw Romanowski, Polish poet.
Jan Stebnowski, Polish painter and publicist.
Aleksander Topolski, soldier, architect, and writer, author of "Without Vodka".
Dmytro Zipchen, Canadian politician.
Ignaz Zloczower, Résistance Fighter 1876-1942

References

External links

Horodenka in the Encyclopedia of Ukraine
Horodenka in the JewishGen ShtetLinks project
The Book of Horodenka
Photographs of Jewish sites in Horodenka in the Jewish History in Galicia and Bukovina
The Jewish Community of Gorodenka, The Museum of the Jewish People at Beit Hatfutsot
Tour in Horodenka
 

Cities in Ivano-Frankivsk Oblast
Stanisławów Voivodeship
Shtetls
Cities of district significance in Ukraine
Holocaust locations in Ukraine